Angela Asher is a Canadian film and television actress. She is most noted for her role as Tara Mercer in 18 to Life, for which she received a nomination for Best Actress in a Comedy Series at the 26th Gemini Awards in 2011.

She has also had recurring or regular roles in the television series Married Life, This Is Wonderland, Degrassi, Inhuman Condition, Bad Blood, Hard Rock Medical and Workin' Moms, and appeared in the films Interstate 60, King of Sorrow, A Dark Truth and Ghostland.

In 2022, Asher was a candidate in the 2022 Ontario general election for the New Blue Party of Ontario, which garnered publicity by opposing public health measures against COVID-19. She ran in Spadina—Fort York, placing fifth with under two percent of the vote while incumbent MPP Chris Glover was re-elected.

Filmography

Film

Television

Electoral record

References

External links

Canadian television actresses
Canadian film actresses
Canadian web series actresses
21st-century Canadian actresses
Living people
Year of birth missing (living people)